The 1999 Delta State gubernatorial election occurred in Nigeria on January 9, 1999. The PDP nominee James Ibori won the election, defeating the APP candidate.

James Ibori emerged PDP candidate.

Electoral system
The Governor of Delta State is elected using the plurality voting system.

Primary election

PDP primary
The PDP primary election was won by James Ibori.

Results
The total number of registered voters in the state was 1,547,685. Total number of votes cast was 911,605, while number of valid votes was 899,287. Rejected votes were 12,318.

References 

Delta State gubernatorial elections
Delta State gubernatorial election
Delta State gubernatorial election
Delta State gubernatorial election